Hoodlum is a 1997 American crime drama film that gives a fictionalized account of the gang war between the Italian/Jewish mafia alliance and the black gangsters of Harlem that took place in the late 1920s and early 1930s. The film concentrates on Ellsworth "Bumpy" Johnson (Laurence Fishburne), Dutch Schultz (Tim Roth), and Lucky Luciano (Andy García).

Plot
In 1934, Ellsworth “Bumpy” Johnson (Laurence Fishburne) is released from Sing Sing and returns to Harlem, where mobster Dutch Schultz (Tim Roth) asserts his control of the lucrative numbers game. Schultz begrudgingly reports to Mafia boss Charles “Lucky” Luciano (Andy Garcia), who pays bribes to special prosecutor Thomas E. Dewey (William Atherton) to protect his business.

Reuniting with his cousin "Illinois" Gordon (Chi McBride), Bumpy returns to the employ of Harlem crime boss Madame Queen (Cicely Tyson), whose business is threatened by Schultz. Bumpy is introduced to Francine (Vanessa Williams), a friend of Illinois’ girlfriend Mary (Loretta Devine). Schultz’s meeting with the Queen ends in a standoff when he presents her with a rival’s testicles. Walking Francine home from a club, Bumpy charms her with his poetry.

Madame Queen is attacked by Schultz’s men, led by black enforcer Bub Hewlett (Clarence Williams III), but Bumpy and fellow mobster Whispers (Paul Benjamin) repel the assassins and rescue her. At a meeting of the Commission, Schultz states his determination to take over Harlem. After robbing Schultz’s operation with Illinois, Bumpy is chastised by Madame Queen for making his own decisions. Schultz then hires two hitmen, the Salke brothers, to kill Bumpy, and has his police contact, NYPD Captain Foley (Richard Bradford), arrange for Madame Queen's arrest. At a party, a 17-year-old named Tyrone asks Bumpy for a job, and Francine struggles to reconcile her feelings for Bumpy with his criminal ways.

The Salkes break into Bumpy’s home, killing his guards, but Bumpy ambushes them and kills one while a terrified Francine shoots the other dead. Illinois is beaten and robbed by Foley and his officers, while Madame Queen is arrested for illegal gambling. Taking over her operation, Bumpy enlists Tyrone as a runner, and ignores the Queen’s orders to avoid violence. By May 1935, he is locked in an all-out war with Schultz. His wealth and power grow, as does the body count, including Tyrone. Bumpy’s attempt to comfort Tyrone’s mother at his funeral is rejected.

At an ice cream parlor with Francine, Bumpy realizes his banana split has been poisoned. When the shop owner reveals that Bumpy’s associate Vallie ordered him to hire the new teenage employee responsible, Bumpy forces the boy to eat the poisoned ice cream despite his attempts to apologize. Whispers then kills Vallie with a razor. Bumpy confronts Schultz at the Cotton Club with Vallie’s severed finger, demanding he cease his Harlem operations, but Schultz refuses.

Disguised as truck drivers, Bumpy and Illinois deliver a bomb to one of Schultz’s illicit breweries, narrowly escaping before the warehouse explodes. Illinois returns home to find Schultz had Mary killed in retaliation. Threatened by Dewey to end the bloodshed in Harlem, Luciano invites Bumpy and Schultz to a meeting, against both their wills.

Visiting Madame Queen in prison, Bumpy is rebuked for inciting a gang war. Finding she can no longer accept who he is, Francine leaves him, and Illinois drunkenly confronts him over the innocent lives lost. Illinois is abducted and tortured by Foley, to Hewlett’s disgust, but refuses to betray his cousin. At Luciano’s meeting, Bumpy and Schultz refuse to settle their dispute. After finding Illinois’ corpse left as a message, Bumpy slits Foley’s throat while he's with a black prostitute, but spares Hewlett’s life and offers him a partnership.

Bumpy accepts an alliance with Luciano, and Luciano’s driver – on Bumpy’s orders – informs Schultz that Bumpy will be meeting with Luciano’s accountant. Schultz and his men burst in but find only the accountant, whom Schultz kills. At a restaurant, Schultz’s long-suffering henchman Lulu (Ed O'Ross) shoots him in the bathroom, and Schultz calmly returns to his table before dying. Meeting Luciano outside for payment, Lulu is shot dead. With Dutch eliminated and the gang war settled, Dewey – having received an enormous bribe from Bumpy, delivered by Hewlett – warns Luciano to stay away from Harlem. Hewlett and Bumpy part ways, and Bumpy arrives at Illinois’ funeral. After exchanging looks with Francine and Madame Queen, Bumpy walks out into the rain alone.

Cast
 Laurence Fishburne as Ellsworth 'Bumpy' Johnson
 Tim Roth as Arthur Flegenheimer / Dutch Schultz
 Andy Garcia as Charles 'Lucky' Luciano
 Vanessa Williams as Francine Hughes
 Cicely Tyson as Stephanie 'Madam Queen' St. Clair
 Chi McBride as Illinois Gordon
 Clarence Williams III as 'Bub' Hewlett
 Richard Bradford as Captain Jack Foley
 William Atherton as Thomas E. Dewey
 Loretta Devine as Pigfoot Mary
 Queen Latifah as Sulie
 Ed O'Ross as Bernard 'Lulu' Rosenkrantz
 Eddie Bo Smith Jr. as Tee-Ninchy
 Mike Starr as Albert Salke
 Beau Starr as Jules Salke
 Paul Benjamin as 'Whispers'
 Tony Rich as Duke Ellington

Production
Although set in 1930s Harlem, the film was shot in Chicago.

Soundtrack

A soundtrack containing hip hop and R&B music was released on August 12, 1997 by Interscope Records. It peaked at #94 on the Billboard 200 and #23 on the Top R&B/Hip-Hop Albums.

Reception
The film received mixed reviews from critics. Review aggregation website Rotten Tomatoes gives the film a score of 43% based on 21 reviews. Audiences surveyed by CinemaScore gave the film a grade B on scale of A to F.

Critic Roger Ebert noted that "the film is being marketed as a violent action picture, and in a sense, it is" and that director Bill Duke having made "a historical drama as much as a thriller, and his characters reflect a time when Harlem seemed poised on the brink of better things, and the despair of the postwar years was not easily seen on its prosperous streets."
It was also criticized for many historical inaccuracies.

See also
 Hoodlum at Wiktionary
 American Gangster (film)
 Godfather of Harlem: a 2019 Epix television series, starring Forest Whitaker as Ellsworth "Bumpy" Johnson.

References

External links
 
 
 

1997 films
American crime thriller films
Biographical films about gangsters
Films scored by Elmer Bernstein
Films about race and ethnicity
Films set in New York City
Films shot in New York City
Films shot in Chicago
Films directed by Bill Duke
Films about African-American organized crime
Hood films
Films about the American Mafia
Films about Jewish-American organized crime
Films set in Harlem
Films set in the 1920s
Films set in the 1930s
United Artists films
Cultural depictions of Lucky Luciano
Cultural depictions of Duke Ellington
Cultural depictions of Dutch Schultz
1990s English-language films
1990s American films